Bernard Elliott "Bernie" Barrow (December 30, 1927 – August 4, 1993) was an American actor and collegiate drama professor.  He was best known as an actor for his role as Johnny Ryan, a publican and the patriarch of an Irish-American family on the television soap opera Ryan's Hope, on which he appeared from 1975 until the show's demise in 1989.

Born in New York City, he received a bachelor's degree at Syracuse University in 1947, a masters at Columbia in 1948, and a doctorate from Yale Drama School in 1957.  He taught theater at Brooklyn College for three decades.  He directed summer stock and community theater throughout these years as well.  Before starring on Ryan's Hope, he played a reporter on a Feb. 1968 episode of The Doctors . He later had the role of "Earl Dana" on Where the Heart Is in 1969–1970, Dan Kincaid on The Secret Storm from 1970 to 1974 and Ira Paulson on The Edge of Night in 1974–1975. After his 13-year run with Ryan's Hope, he was cast in 1990 in the role of Louie Slavinsky on Loving, and continued with the role even after his diagnosis with lung cancer. Barrow died at the age of 65 in New York City.

Before Ryan's Hope, Barrow had a small part in one of the most-watched TV episodes of its time.  In the series Rhoda, Barrow played the judge who married Rhoda Morgenstern and Joe Gerard in the 1974 episode Rhoda's Wedding.  He was nominated four times for an Emmy Award for Daytime Supporting Actor (1979, 1988, and 1992), taking the award in 1991.

Filmography

References

External links

1927 births
1993 deaths
Deaths from lung cancer in New York (state)
20th-century American male actors
American male film actors
American male television actors
American male soap opera actors
Daytime Emmy Award winners
Daytime Emmy Award for Outstanding Supporting Actor in a Drama Series winners
Male actors from New York City
Brooklyn College faculty